Samantha "Sam" Roddick (born 1 July 1971) is the founder of Coco de Mer, a British lingerie brand and retail store. She is the daughter of Body Shop founder and activist Anita Roddick.

Early life and education
Roddick is the younger daughter of Anita and Gordon Roddick. She was educated at Summerlea Primary School and then at Frensham Heights in Surrey until she was asked to leave at age 16. She gained only two O-Levels due to having undiagnosed dyslexia. On leaving Frensham, the mother of a schoolmate suggested she work with her in Nepal, which is where her activism began.

Early activism
Roddick's early activism included talks, fundraisers and projects worldwide. In addition, she set up Cockroach, a youth magazine; and taught art in Vancouver. Roddick backed the Women's Equality Party's campaign to encourage women to vote in the UK's 2016 referendum on its membership of the EU.

Coco de Mer

In December 2001, Roddick opened Coco de Mer in Covent Garden's Monmouth Street with an evening hosted by Dave Stewart, and a fly-poster campaign by Saatchi and Saatchi. In 2004 Roddick was prevented from registering the Coco de Mer name as a trade mark by French fashion designer Coco Chanel, the lawsuit citing the similarity in product range and name.

In 2011 the brand was purchased by British sex shop Lovehoney. In April 2014 former La Perla brand director Lucy Litwack was appointed as managing director of the company. Cristina Ceresoli was also brought on to be interim Chief Marketing Officer.

The name comes from the coco de mer palm tree of the Seychelles, which has the largest seed in the world. The seed is said to resemble a woman's buttocks.

Bondage For Freedom
Bondage for Freedom was founded in 2008, focusing on fighting for human and environmental rights. It had worked on a number of projects, including the 1994 Rwandan genocide; the release of the "Angola Three"; preventing sex-trafficking; and colony collapse disorder.

Television
Roddick is an advisor on The Joy of Teen Sex.

References

External links
 

1971 births
Living people
English businesspeople
People from Rustington
English women in business
People educated at Frensham Heights School